Domhnall mac Lorcan (died 937) was King of Uí Fiachrach Aidhne, Ireland.

Sub anno 937, the Annals of the Four Masters states Domhnall, son of Lorcan, lord of Aidhne, died at Cluain mic Nois.

References

 Irish Kings and High-Kings, Francis John Byrne (2001), Dublin: Four Courts Press, 
 Annals of Ulster at CELT: Corpus of Electronic Texts at University College Cork

People from County Galway
10th-century Irish monarchs
937 deaths
Year of birth unknown